Aunty Donna's Big Ol' House of Fun is a sketch comedy television show on Netflix, created by and starring members of the Australian comedy group Aunty Donna. It premiered on 11 November 2020. The series' music was composed almost entirely by Tom Armstrong, a member of the sketch troupe. The show's absurdist approach has been compared to the likes of Monty Python and Tim and Eric.

Cast

Main 
The three performing members portray themselves on the show, but as fictionalized caricatures, as well as several characters drawn from other Aunty Donna shows and podcasts.

 Mark Samual Bonanno Characters/Impressions:
 Bill Smith and Janiel Smith (S1E1, Family Feud scene)
 Audience member Adam (S1E3, Blair Buoyant scene)
 Cool Barber (S1E4, Barbershop scene)
 Old Italian Man (S1E5, Italian man scene)
 Mark's Mother (S1E5, Italian man scene)
 Man who doesn't want to fight (S1E5, Fight scene)
 S.W.A.T. team member (S1E5, S.W.A.T. S.W.A.T. song)
 Tiny Man (S1E6, Tiny man song)
 Broden Kelly Characters/Impressions:
 Cowdoy (S1E1, throughout)
 Nervous looking man (S1E1 Man who just shit himself scene)
 Scottish South African Sam (S1E2, South African Sams scene)
 Ellen DeGeneres (S1E2, Ellen DeGeneres scene)
 Anti-Doping Agency Representative (S1E3, piss-drinking scene)
 The Hunk (S1E4, The Hunk and the Dork scene)
 Man who doesn't want to fight (S1E5, Fight scene)
 S.W.A.T. team member (S1E5, S.W.A.T. S.W.A.T. song)
 Angry Contestant (S1E6, The Quiz show scene)
 Zachary Ruane Characters/Impressions:
 Man who just shit himself (S1E1, Man who just shit himself scene)
 Ben Smith and Danuary Smith (S1E1, Family Feud scene)
 New-Zealander South African Sam (S1E2, South African Sams scene)
 Blair Buoyant (S1E3, Blair Buoyant scene)
 French man from 1832 (S1E4, "Isn't it funny and relatable" song)
 Moogie Woogie (S1E4, Moogie Woogie Boogie song) 
 The Dork (S1E4, The Hunk and the Dork scene)
 Cool Barber (S1E4, Barbershop scene)
 Man who doesn't want to fight (S1E5, Fight scene)
 S.W.A.T. team member (S1E5, S.W.A.T. S.W.A.T. song)
 Pausey Pete (S1E6, The quiz show scene)
 Lord Whoopee (S1E6, Etiquette lesson scene)

All three non-performing members of Aunty Donna also make screen appearances:
Sam Lingham:
 cowboy (S1E1, Roommate search scene)
Max Miller:
 Director (S1E5, Italian man scene)
Tom Armstrong
 Tom (S1E1, Family Feud scene)

Guests 
 Randy Feltface as himself 
 Kristen Schaal as the dishwasher (Voice)
 Karan Soni as Jerry Seinfeld
 Ed Helms as himself / Egg Helms
 Kia Stevens as herself / Awesome Kong
 Ronny Chieng as Voice-Over
 Antony Starr as Stray Man
 Sarah Burns as Pirate
 Jack Quaid as Basketball Player
 "Weird Al" Yankovic as himself and Lindsay
 Scott Aukerman as Police Officer 1 
 Mary Sohn as Police Officer 2 
 Tawny Newsome as The Queen of England 
 Paul F. Tompkins as Jukebox 
 Ify Nwadiwe as Grenadier Guardsman
 Brendan Scannell as Grenadier Guardsman
 Alyssa Limperis as Poster Clerk
 Michelle Brasier as various including Sports Doctor and S.W.A.T.-S.W.A.T. member
 Ben Russell as various including Bar Inspector and Tommy Nipple Tassels 
 Rekha Shankar as various including woman at fight-scene 
 Robert Pieton as Different Hat
 Jessica Knappett as Zach pretending to be an English Lady at the Bar

Episodes

Production 
Aunty Donna's Big Ol' House of Fun, which is based on the acting of the members of Aunty Donna, a sketch comedy troupe, was announced in July 2020.

Filming took place in the United States, as well as Melbourne, Australia. In addition to Mark Samual Bonanno, Broden Kelly and Zachary Ruane starring in the series as caricatures as themselves, notable actors and comedians, including Ed Helms (who also serves as an executive producer), "Weird Al" Yankovic and Kia Stevens, appear in cameos. Tawny Newsome portrays the "Queen of England", and Kristen Schaal voices the troupe's dishwasher.

Release & Reception 
The entirety of the first season, which consists of six episodes, was released on 11 November 2020, on Netflix.

The first season was critically acclaimed, receiving a rating of 100% on Rotten Tomatoes. On Metacritic, it has a score of 85 out of 100, based on reviews from 4 critics, indicating "universal acclaim". Junkee noted that "it seems the entire world has learned that the Aunty Donna boys are hilarious, a fact many Aussies have known for a long time after their new series dropped on Netflix last week." The media website also praised the many cameos made by Ed Helms, "Weird Al" Yankovic, and Randy Feltface. The Guardian commented on how many of Aunty Donna's previous Australian YouTube and Reddit followers enjoyed the show, and Decider said that the members of the comedy troupe were "the illegitimate grandchildren of Monty Python and sons of Tom Green." TV Tonight gave the first season four out of five stars.

References

External links 
 
 

2020 American television series debuts
2020 Australian television series debuts
2020s American sketch comedy television series
2020s Australian comedy television series
English-language Netflix original programming
Surreal comedy television series